Cecil Macks Pass, Is situated in the KwaZulu-Natal province of South Africa in the vicinity of Ingwavuma.

Mountain passes of KwaZulu-Natal